The Leader of the Official Opposition is the politician who leads the official Opposition in Greece.

Role
The Leader of the Opposition is normally the leader of the largest party not within the government, which is usually the second largest political party in the Hellenic Parliament.

One exception to this rule was during the Papademos government, when Antonis Samaras, leader of the New Democracy, despite supporting the new government, retained the position of Leader of the Opposition. According to the Standing Orders of the Hellenic Parliament (Art. 20) "The President of the largest Parliamentary Group which does not participate in the Government, is called Leader of the Opposition and has special rights recognised by the Parliament's Standing Orders and current provisions". Because Samaras wanted to retain this position, no New Democracy MPs joined the Government, since if a single MP had joined the Government as a minister that would have meant that the New Democracy Parliamentary Group participated in the Government. Only non-MPs were allowed to join the Government. In fact, the new Defence Minister, Dimitris Avramopoulos, was forced to resign from his seat in order to satisfy the above provision. Despite protests form the other parties, the Parliament's Speaker decided that there was no violation of Art. 20, since no New Democracy MP participated in the Government.

Following the January 2015 legislative election, Antonis Samaras, leader of the New Democracy, became Leader of the Opposition for a second time.

Samaras resigned as chairman of New Democracy on 5 July 2015, after the overwhelming victory of the "No" vote in the Greek bailout referendum, naming Vangelis Meimarakis as transitional chairman.

List of leaders of the opposition since 1974
Political party:

See also
Prime Minister of Greece

References

Greece
Lists of Greek MPs
Political office-holders in Greece
Greek shadow cabinets